Camaleônicos is a book-report by writer Selma Sueli Silva. The work focuses on a group of Brazilian and Portuguese autistic adults. The book was released in March 2019.

Book's Overview 
Camaleônicos is at the same time the book, the report and denunciation about the difficulties of autistic people to be understood. Thus, the author argues that, faced with bureaucracy and cruel indifference, there are many who give up fighting for acceptance, depriving everyone of their peculiar gifts. She also collects reports that society accepts one more word written on paper with a stamp and the signature that the honest request for respect for difference and that understanding autism was easy, but more difficult was understanding what they thought autism was. In this way, the book mixes disappointment and hope through the narratives presented. The title was chosen because it symbolizes that autistic adults often have to camouflage themselves in order to survive in inaccessible environments.

In this book, Silva also observes that many professionals are afraid to give the report to the autistic adult because they think that he has already lived his life in a functional way. The author is critical of this point of view, also because this autistic adult is at risk of having a crisis and being hospitalized, receiving a mistaken and more serious diagnosis than that of autism, which can cause worse consequences for his life. For her, the diagnosis of autism is an important guideline, at any stage of life.

Reception 
Camaleônicos has become a reference for academic research, being cited in scientific articles on romantic relationships among autistic people and also on language aspects of this population. The book also served as the basis for lectures on autistic adults.

References 

2019 non-fiction books
Brazilian non-fiction books
Books about autism
Books about autistic women